The 2020 Kentucky Open was a professional tennis tournament played on indoor hard courts. It was the first edition of the tournament which was part of the 2020 ITF Women's World Tennis Tour. It took place in Nicholasville, Kentucky, United States between 10 and 16 February 2020.

Singles main-draw entrants

Seeds

 1 Rankings are as of 3 February 2020.

Other entrants
The following players received wildcards into the singles main draw:
  Catherine Bellis
  Irina Falconi
  Claire Liu
  Aldila Sutjiadi

The following players received entry from the qualifying draw:
  Hanna Chang
  Elizabeth Halbauer
  Jamie Loeb
  Maria Mateas
  Grace Min
  Marcela Zacarías
  Renata Zarazúa
  Zhang Yuxuan

The following players received entry as lucky losers:
  Françoise Abanda
  Gabriela Talabă

Champions

Singles

 Olga Govortsova def.  Claire Liu, 6–4, 6–4

Doubles

 Quinn Gleason /  Catherine Harrison def.  Hailey Baptiste /  Whitney Osuigwe, 7–5, 6–2

References

External links
 2020 Kentucky Open at ITFtennis.com
 Official website

2020 ITF Women's World Tennis Tour
2020 in American tennis
2020 in sports in Kentucky
February 2020 sports events in the United States
Nicholasville, Kentucky